Norbert Moret (20 November 1921 – 17 November 1998) was a Swiss composer, conductor, pianist, and teacher.

Life
Born in Ménières, Switzerland, Moret composed at least 36 instrumental and vocal works between 1966 and 1998, the year of his death.  While he never achieved great worldwide recognition, he was honored by prizes and an honorary doctorate, and his music has been recorded by notable artists, Anne-Sophie Mutter (she performed his Violin Concerto En rêve) and Mstislav Rostropovich (he performed his Cello Concerto) among them.

He died in Fribourg aged 76.

References
Musinfo: Norbert Moret
Musicinfo (a joint project by the Musicological Institute of the University of Zurich, the Association of Swiss Musicians (STV/ASM), the Swiss Music Edition (SME/EMS), and the SUISA-foundation for music)

External links
Musinfo: Norbert Moret Biography, List of Works (with links to an incomplete list of recordings of his works)

1921 births
1998 deaths
20th-century classical composers
20th-century classical pianists
20th-century conductors (music)
20th-century male musicians
Male classical pianists
Swiss classical composers
Swiss conductors (music)
Swiss male classical composers
Swiss classical pianists
Male conductors (music)
People from the canton of Fribourg
20th-century Swiss composers